The 1970 Davidson Wildcats football team represented Davidson College as a member of the Southern Conference (SoCon) during the 1970 NCAA University Division football season. Led by first-year head coach Dave Fagg, the Wildcats compiled an overall record of 2–8 with a mark of 2–4 in conference play, placing sixth in the SoCon.

Schedule

References

Davidson
Davidson Wildcats football seasons
Davidson Wildcats football